Look Left  is album by American banjoist Alison Brown, released in 1994.

Reception 

In his Allmusic review, music critic Johnny Lofthus called the album "a cleanly played set that's as crisp as white sheets on a springtime clothesline."

Track listing 
All compositions by Alison Brown unless otherwise noted
 "Étouffée Brutus?" – 3:16
 "View From Above" – 4:52
 "Look Left" – 4:59
 "Rain Again" – 5:14
 "The Red Earth" (Alison Brown, Garry West) –  6:01
 "Deep North" – 5:38
 "The Dalai Camel" –  5:38
 "The Inspector" –  3:07
 "Cara's Way/ (The Little People)" – 5:18
 "Traveler's Rest" (Brown, West) – 2:18

Personnel
 Alison Brown – banjo, guitar
 Pat Candless – soprano sax
 Alan Dargin – digeridoo
 Joey Dukes – drums
 Matt Eakle – flute
 Mike Marshall – mandolin
 Scott Nygaard – guitar
 Garry West – bass
 Rick Reed – drums
 Bill Miller – flute, wooden floote
 John Burr – piano, keyboards
 Sam Bacco – percussion
 Joey Miskulin – accordion
 Seamus Egan – drums, pipe, whistle, penny whistle
 Jeff King – electric guitar

References

1994 albums
Vanguard Records albums
Alison Brown albums